Gymnammodytes is a genus of sand lances native to the eastern Atlantic Ocean, the Mediterranean Sea and the southwestern Indian Ocean along the coast of Africa.

Species
The currently recognized species in this genus are:
 Gymnammodytes capensis (Barnard, 1927) (Cape sand lance)
 Gymnammodytes cicerelus (Rafinesque, 1810) (Mediterranean sand eel)
 Gymnammodytes semisquamatus (S. Jourdain, 1879) (smooth sand eel)

References

Ammodytidae
Marine fish genera
Taxa named by Georg Duncker
Taxa named by Erna Mohr